This is a list of songs which reached number one on the Billboard Mainstream Top 40 chart in 2005.

During 2005, a total of 13 singles hit number-one on the charts.

Chart history

See also
2005 in music

References

Billboard charts
United States Mainstream Top 40
Mainstream Top 40 2005